Ronald Chapman Giffin,  (December 1, 1942 – April 15, 2021) was a lawyer and politician in Nova Scotia, Canada. He represented Truro-Bible Hill in the Nova Scotia House of Assembly from 1978 to 1993 as a Progressive Conservative member.

He was born in Windsor, Nova Scotia and was educated at the Windsor Academy, Acadia University and Dalhousie Law School. He was called to the Nova Scotia bar in 1966 and set up practice in Truro. Giffin was named Queen's Counsel in 1982. He served in the Executive Council of Nova Scotia as Minister of Municipal Affairs, Minister of Transportation, Minister of Vocational and Technical Training, Minister of Education, Attorney General and Provincial Secretary. He was also president of the Nova Scotia Treasury Board.

Giffin died on April 15, 2021.

References

External links 

 Entry from Canadian Who's Who

1942 births
2021 deaths
People from Truro, Nova Scotia
Progressive Conservative Association of Nova Scotia MLAs
Members of the Executive Council of Nova Scotia
Canadian King's Counsel